Bocconcini (singular  , "small mouthful") are small mozzarella cheese balls.  Like other mozzarellas, they are semi-soft, white, and rindless unripened mild cheeses that originated in Naples and were once made only from the milk of water buffalo. Nowadays, they are usually made from a combination of water buffalo and cow's milk. Bocconcini are packaged in whey or water, have a  spongy texture, and absorb flavors.

It is made in the pasta filata manner by dipping curds into hot sauce, and kneading, pulling, and stretching. Baby (bambini) bocconcini can also be purchased; these are a smaller version, about the size of large grapes or cherries. This smaller version is also known as ciliegine (small cherries).

Bocconcini of water buffalo's milk are still produced in the provinces of Naples, Caserta, and Salerno, as bocconcini alla panna di bufala, in a process that involves mixing freshly made Mozzarella di Bufala Campana DOP with fresh cream. A Bocconcino di Bufala Campana DOP is also made, which is simply Mozzarella di Bufala Campana DOP, produced in the egg-sized format.

Bocconcini of whole cow's milk are also manufactured, in which the higher liquid content, in comparison to standard mozzarella, lends them the soft consistency of fior di latte.

Bocconcini can be bought at most Italian supermarkets. They are often used in caprese salad, or served to accompany pasta.

See also
 List of stretch-cured cheeses
 List of water buffalo cheeses
Buffalo mozzarella

References

External links
How to Make Bocconcini - Illustrated Step By Step. 

Cow's-milk cheeses
Water buffalo's-milk cheeses
Italian cheeses
Neapolitan cuisine
Stretched-curd cheeses